
Gmina Jastrowie is an urban-rural gmina (administrative district) in Złotów County, Greater Poland Voivodeship, in west-central Poland.

Villages
Apart from the town of Jastrowie, Gmina Jastrowie contains the villages and settlements of Brzeźnica, Brzeźnica-Kolonia, Budy, Budy-Folwark, Drzewiec, Krępsko, Nadarzyce, Piaski-Leśniczówka, Samborsko, Sypniewko, Sypniewko-Folwark, Sypniewo, Sypniewo-Kolonia and Trzebieszki.

Neighbouring gminas
Gmina Jastrowie is bordered by the gminas of Borne Sulinowo, Czaplinek, Okonek, Szydłowo, Tarnówka, Wałcz and Złotów.

References
Polish official population figures 2006

Jastrowie
Złotów County